Waldo Junction (formerly Waldo and Cabbage Patch) is an unincorporated community in Yuba County, California.

A post office operated here from 1898 to 1915. Originally called Cabbage Patch in 1852, the name changed to Waldo upon the opening of the post office.  The name honors William Waldo, an early settler.

References

Unincorporated communities in California
Populated places established in 1852
Unincorporated communities in Yuba County, California
1852 establishments in California